Events from the year 1778 in art.

Events
 December – The artistic cargo of the British ship Westmorland, seized by the French, is acquired by Spanish interests.
 Nicholas Pocock gives up his career as a seaman and devotes himself to painting.

Paintings

 John Singleton Copley – Watson and the Shark
 Francisco Goya – Children With a Cart
 Jean-Antoine Houdon – Portrait busts of Rousseau and Voltaire
 John Hamilton Mortimer – Sir Arthegal, the Knight of Justice, with Talus, the Iron Man (from Spenser’s ‘Faerie Queene’)
 Sir Joshua Reynolds
 Jane, Countess of Harrington
 Lady Caroline Howard
 Captain John Hayes St Leger
 George Romney – Jane Gordon, Duchess of Gordon, and Her Son, George Gordon
 Richard Samuel – Portraits in the Characters of the Muses in the Temple of Apollo
 Gilbert Stuart – Self-portrait
 Benjamin West – The Battle of the Boyne
 Johann Zoffany – Tribuna of the Uffizi (completed)

Births
 January 1 – Charles Alexandre Lesueur, artist and explorer (died 1846)
 February 22 
 Franz Ludwig Catel, German artist (died 1856)
 Rembrandt Peale, American artist (died 1860)
 May 31 – John Jackson, English portrait painter (died 1831)
 June 7  – Beau Brummell, leader of fashion (died 1840)
 June 10
 Cornelis Cels, Belgian painter of portraits and historical subjects (died 1859)
 Joseph Willibrord Mähler, German portrait painter (died 1860)
 June 15 – Henri Jean-Baptiste Victoire Fradelle, Franco-English painter (died 1865)
 August 4 – Christian Duttenhofer, German engraver (died 1843)
 August 11 – John Christian Schetky, Scottish-born marine painter (died 1874)
 August 17 
 Johannes Hermanus Koekkoek, Dutch painter (died 1851)
 John Varley, English watercolour painter and astrologer (died 1842)
 Johannes Hermanus Koekkoek, Dutch painter and draughtsman (died 1851)
 August 31 – Friedrich August von Klinkowström, German artist, author and teacher (died 1835)
 September 1 – Reverend John Thomson, minister of Duddingston Kirk and Landscape artist (died 1840)
 October 5 – John James Masquerier, British portrait artist (died 1855)
 date unknown
 Allen Robert Branston, English wood-engraver (died 1827)
 Wilhelmina Krafft, Swedish painter and portrait miniaturist (died 1828)
 Nukina Kaioku, Japanese painter and calligrapher (died 1863)
 Tang Yifen, Chinese landscape painter and calligrapher during the Qing Dynasty (died 1853)

Deaths
 January 4 - Charles-Dominique-Joseph Eisen, French painter and draftsman (born 1720)
 February 19 – Nathan Drake, English painter (born c.1728)
 February 24 – Laurent Delvaux, French sculptor (born 1696)
 March – Thomas Roberts, Irish landscape painter (born 1748)
 March 6 – Gaudenzio Botti,  Italian painter, mainly active in Brescia (born 1698)
 May 20 – Gaetano Zompini, Italian printmaker and engraver (born 1700)
 September 11 – Johann Sebastian Bach, German painter and grandson of the composer (born 1748)
 October 2 – Françoise Duparc, Spanish born Baroque painter who later lived in France (born 1726)
 November 9 – Giovanni Battista Piranesi, Italian artist (born 1720)
 December 15 - Catherine Read, Scottish portrait-painter (born 1723)
 December 22 – Simon Mathurin Lantara, French landscape painter (born 1729)
 date unknown
 John Cobb, English cabinetmaker (born 1710)
 Jean Girardet, French painter of portrait miniatures (born 1709)
 Ignazio Hugford, or Ignatius Heckford, Florentine painter (born 1703)
 Jean-Baptiste Lemoyne, French sculptor (born 1704)
 Wojciech Rojowski, Polish sculptor and woodcarver (born unknown)
 Pieter Vanderlyn, American colonial painter (born 1687)

References

 
Years of the 18th century in art
1770s in art